Discothyrea antarctica is a species of ant in the genus Discothyrea and is endemic to New Zealand. It is found in native forests throughout the country.

References

 Antweb
 LandCare

External links

Proceratiinae
Ants of New Zealand
Insects described in 1895
Endemic fauna of New Zealand
Taxa named by Carlo Emery

Hymenoptera of New Zealand
Endemic insects of New Zealand